Kolyvansky (masculine), Kolyvanskaya (feminine), or Kolyvanskoye (neuter) may refer to:
Kolyvansky District, a district of Novosibirsk Oblast, Russia
Kolyvanskoye, a rural locality (a selo) in Altai Krai, Russia